The Commission for Environmental Cooperation (CEC;) was established by Canada, Mexico, and the United States to implement the North American Agreement on Environmental Cooperation (NAAEC), the environmental side accord to the North American Free Trade Agreement. The CEC's mission is to facilitate cooperation and public participation to foster conservation, protection and enhancement of the North American environment for the benefit of present and future generations, in the context of increasing economic, trade and social links among Canada, Mexico and the United States.

Origins and structure
The Commission for Environmental Cooperation was created in 1994 by Canada, Mexico and the United States, under the NAAEC. The NAAEC was implemented in parallel to the North American Free Trade Agreement (NAFTA) and complements the environmental provisions of NAFTA. It signified a commitment that liberalization of trade and economic growth in North America would be accompanied by collaboration and continuous improvement in the environmental protection provided by each of the three signatory countries. In part, the NAAEC was driven by the desire of the United States to mitigate public concern about the impact of trade liberalization on environmental protection in the three countries, particularly Mexico.

The CEC is the first international environmental organization created in parallel with a trade agreement and is the sole organization with a mandate to monitor and report upon the impact of trade on the environment of North America.

The CEC is composed of the Council, the Secretariat and the Joint Public Advisory Committee.

CEC Council

The Council is the CEC's governing body and is composed of the highest-level federal environmental authorities from Canada, Mexico, and the United States: the Canadian Minister of Environment and Climate Change, the Mexican Secretary of Environment and Natural Resources (Semarnat), and the Administrator of the US Environmental Protection Agency.

The Council meets at least once a year, including with the public, to set the CEC's overall direction, including its budget and activities. It assigns responsibilities, if needed, to committees, working groups or expert groups, as may be required to fulfill its mandate.

Secretariat

The CEC Secretariat is headquartered in Montreal. The Secretariat implements several projects under the operational plan authorized by the Council and processes submissions on enforcement matters.

Joint Public Advisory Committee

The Joint Public Advisory Committee (JPAC) is composed of fifteen citizens (five from each country).  JPAC advises the Council on any matter within the scope of the North American Agreement on Environmental Cooperation and serves as a source of information for the CEC Secretariat.

As a group of volunteer citizens, JPAC is a microcosm of the public: independent individuals who contribute diverse but rich institutional experience and cultural perspectives.

In addition, in 2015 the CEC established a Roster of Experts on Traditional Ecological Knowledge (TEK) whose mandate it is to identify opportunities to apply TEK to the CEC's operations and policy recommendations. This is an innovative mechanism and the first traditional ecological knowledge panel to be named to a trilateral organization such as the CEC. In July 2017, the group was re-christened the "TEK Expert Group" and now reports directly to the CEC Council.

Cooperative Work Program

The CEC's cooperative agenda is defined through the Strategic Plan. The current CEC Strategic Plan 2015–2020 identifies three areas of priority action for the CEC: Climate Change Mitigation and Adaptation, Green Growth, and Sustainable Communities and Ecosystems.
 
Two-year Operational Plans present how the goals and objectives of the Strategic Plan will be implemented through project activities and key initiatives, and specify the budget for the Commission. Operational Plans are updated biennially.

North American Partnership for Environmental Community Action

In 2010, the CEC established a grant program, the North American Partnership for Environmental Community Action (NAPECA) to support communities in their efforts to address environmental problems locally. NAPECA is intended to support a flexible and diverse set of project types that will improve access to resources provided by the Parties through the CEC for smaller, more hands-on organizations and that build partnerships at the community level with a focus on sustainable communities and urban initiatives.

Tools and Resources

Publications
The CEC's online publications library provides the public with easy access to its large body of published work on environmental policy and research in North America.

Pollutant Release and Transfer Register
The North American PRTR Project involves the compilation and dissemination of information on the sources, amounts and handling of toxic substances released or transferred by over 35,000 industrial facilities in Canada, the United States, and Mexico, based on data reported to the pollutant release and transfer register (PRTR) of each country. The main products of this project are Taking Stock Online: a website featuring information and a searchable database of integrated, North American PRTR data and the annual Taking Stock report.

The Taking Stock Online tool allows the user to explore information on pollution from industrial facilities across North America. Summary charts and customized queries can be created and the analysis results downloaded in a variety of formats, including kml files for viewing through Google Earth.

North American Environmental Atlas
Created through the cooperation of three national agency partners, the North American Environmental Atlas combines harmonized data from Canada, Mexico and the United States to allow for a continental and regional perspective on environmental issues that cross boundaries. The Atlas continues to grow in breadth and depth as more thematic maps are created through the work of the Commission for Environmental Cooperation (CEC) and its partners. Scientists and map makers from Natural Resources Canada, the United States Geological Survey, Instituto Nacional de Estadística y Geografía, and other agencies in each country produced the information contained in the Atlas. The collection of viewable maps, data, and downloadable map files is available online without cost.

Submissions on Enforcement Matters
Articles 14 and 15 of the NAAEC provide a mechanism whereby any nongovernmental organization or person residing or established in North America can file a submission asserting that a Party to the Agreement is failing to effectively enforce its environmental law. The process is informed by the Guidelines for Submissions on Enforcement Matters under Articles 14 and 15 of the NAAEC. The process may lead to the development and publication of a detailed report, called a factual record, researched and written by independent experts. Past submissions have resulted in improved environmental protection, law and policy changes, and increased budgets for enforcement.

Here is a list of factual records published since 1996:

Independent Secretariat reports
Under NAAEC Article 13, the CEC Secretariat may develop independent reports on any matter within the scope of the annual program and present them to the three Parties and the general public.   These reports may address issues that are not covered by biennial operational plans and have the potential to inform future work of the CEC. Since 1994, the CEC Secretariat has published the following reports:

See also
International Joint Commission

References

External links
 
 Submissions on Enforcement Matters
 Joint Public Advisory Committee

1994 establishments in North America
Environmental organizations established in 1994
Intergovernmental environmental organizations
Intergovernmental organizations established by treaty
North American Free Trade Agreement
Organizations based in Montreal
Trilateral relations of Canada, Mexico, and the United States